Sir Edward Bates, 1st Baronet DL (17 March 1816 – 17 October 1896) was a ship-owner and Conservative politician who represented Plymouth.

Biography 
Bates was the son of Joseph Bates, a wool finisher and exporter and his wife Rebekah Walker. He was sent to Calcutta in 1833 to join his elder brother in the business which his father had started since the ending of the East India Company monopoly. He made two short trips to England in 1838–39 and in 1843, but otherwise remained in India at Calcutta and Bombay until 1848. Back in England, Bates began his own business chartering ships for the Bombay trade. He then started to buy ships, acquiring the newly built Jamsetjee Cursetjee, named after his Parsee partner in Bombay. He had built a fleet of 60 ships in 1860 and eventually owned 130 ships.

Bates became Conservative Member of Parliament for Plymouth in 1871 and held the seat until 1880 when, on 25 June 1880, he was unseated on the grounds of illegal payments by his agents. He regained the seat in 1885, holding it until 1892. He was deputy lieutenant of Hampshire and Lancashire and a J.P. for Lancashire. He was created 1st Baronet Bates, of Bellefield, co. Lancaster on 13 May 1880. He lived at Bellefield, West Derby, Liverpool, Lancashire, Manydown Park, Hampshire, and Gyrn Castle, Llanasa, Flintshire, Wales.

Bates first wife was Charlotte Elizabeth Umfreville-Smith, daughter of Cornelius Umfreville-Smith, whom he married in 1837. He married, secondly, Ellen Thompson, daughter of Thomas Thompson, on 25 June 1844. He had three daughters by his first wife.

References

External links
 

1815 births
1896 deaths
Baronets in the Baronetage of the United Kingdom
Conservative Party (UK) MPs for English constituencies
Deputy Lieutenants of Hampshire
Deputy Lieutenants of Lancashire
UK MPs 1868–1874
UK MPs 1874–1880
UK MPs 1885–1886
UK MPs 1886–1892
Members of the Parliament of the United Kingdom for Plymouth